Perkpolder is a hamlet in the southwestern Netherlands, situated in the municipality of Hulst, Zeeland. It is known as a departure point for the ferry Kruiningen-Perkpolder that connected Zuid-Beveland and Zeelandic Flanders.

Polder
The hamlet is named after the polder in which it is located. This polder was dammed around 1210, and was originally named Noorthofpolder, later this was changed in Paerkpolder or Perkpolder. This polder, which has 166 ha area, has two kilometres of dykes.

References

Populated places in Zeeland
Hulst